Stelidota is a genus of sap-feeding beetles in the family Nitidulidae. There are about 15 described species in Stelidota.

Species
These 15 species belong to the genus Stelidota:

 Stelidota adsuffusa Ford, 1996
 Stelidota alternata Gillogly
 Stelidota championi Sharp, 1890
 Stelidota chontalensis Sharp, 1889
 Stelidota coenosa Erichson, 1843
 Stelidota copiosa Kirejtshuk, 1995
 Stelidota curta Grouvelle, 1905
 Stelidota ferruginea Reitter, 1873
 Stelidota geminata (Say, 1825) (strawberry sap beetle)
 Stelidota multiguttata Reitter, 1877
 Stelidota nigrovaria (Fairmaire, 1849)
 Stelidota octomaculata (Say, 1825)
 Stelidota ruderata Erichson, 1843
 Stelidota strigosa (Gyllenhal, 1808)
 Stelidota thoracica Kirsch, 1873

References

Further reading

External links

 

Nitidulidae
Articles created by Qbugbot